Winifred Ethel Penn-Gaskell (12 November 1874 – 6 November 1949) was a British philatelist who in 1938 was the first woman to be added to the Roll of Distinguished Philatelists. She was a specialist in aerophilately, and the philately of the Peru-Chile war. Penn-Gaskell was president of the Aero-Philatelic Club, London, and her collection of airmail and associated material was bequeathed to the Science Museum, South Kensington.

References

Signatories to the Roll of Distinguished Philatelists
1874 births
1949 deaths
British philatelists
Women philatelists